Montour Falls Historic District is a national historic district located at Montour Falls in Schuyler County, New York.  The district includes 24 mid- and late-19th century structures.  The visual focus of the district is known as the "Glorious T" around the intersection of Genesee and Main Streets.  Notable structures include the Sheriff's Office, Schuyler County Clerk's Office, Montour Falls Village Hall, Montour Falls Memorial Library, and the Greek Revival style Ashton residence.

It was listed on the National Register of Historic Places in 1978.

Gallery

References

Historic districts on the National Register of Historic Places in New York (state)
Shingle Style architecture in New York (state)
Buildings and structures in Schuyler County, New York
National Register of Historic Places in Schuyler County, New York